Iron(III) pyrophosphate is an inorganic chemical compound with the formula Fe4(P2O7)3.

Synthesis
Anhydrous iron(III) pyrophosphate can be prepared by heating the mixture of iron(III) metaphosphate and iron(III) phosphate under oxygen with the stoichiometric ratio 1:3. The reactants can be prepared by reacting iron(III) nitrate nonahydrate with phosphoric acid.

It can be also prepared via the following reaction:
 3 Na4P2O7(aq) + 4 FeCl3(aq) → Fe4(P2O7)3(s) + 12 NaCl(aq)

References

External links 
 
 
 

Iron(III) compounds
Pyrophosphates